The Great Falls Americans were a junior ice hockey team in the Western Hockey League who played a portion of the 1979–80 WHL season. The team was a relocation of the 1978–79 Edmonton Oil Kings franchise, which had previously been the then-named Western Canada Hockey League's (WCHL) Flin Flon Bombers, from the 1967–68 through 1977–78 WCHL seasons. The Americans played at the Four Seasons Arena in Great Falls, Montana.  The team only lasted 28 games of the WHL's 72-game season, winning only two games. After the WHL completed its season, the dormant Americans franchise relocated as the Spokane Flyers.

Season-by-season record
Season statistics 
Note: GP = Games played, W = Wins, L = Losses, T = Ties Pts = Points,GF = Goals for, GA = Goals against

NHL alumni
List of alumni who also played in the National Hockey League.
Dave Barr
Ken Daneyko

References

Defunct ice hockey teams in the United States
Defunct Western Hockey League teams
Ice hockey teams in Montana
1979 establishments in Montana
1980 disestablishments in Montana
Ice hockey clubs established in 1979
Sports clubs disestablished in 1980
Sports in Great Falls, Montana